Surajit Chaudhuri is a computer scientist best known for his contributions to database management systems. He is currently a distinguished scientist at Microsoft Research, where he leads the Data Management, Exploration and Mining group. Chaudhuri is an ACM Fellow. He received his B.Tech. from Indian Institutes of Technology (IIT), Kharagpur, and his Ph.D. in computer science from Stanford University in 1991 under Jeffrey Ullman.
From 1992 to 1995, he has worked at HP Labs, Palo Alto.

References

External links
Website

American computer scientists
Fellows of the Association for Computing Machinery
Living people
Stanford University School of Engineering alumni
Year of birth missing (living people)
Database researchers
Microsoft employees
Microsoft Research people
People from Redmond, Washington
Indian computer scientists